The International Swimming Hall of Fame and Museum (ISHOF) is a history museum and hall of fame, located at One Hall of Fame Drive, Fort Lauderdale, Florida, United States, operated by private interests and serving as the central point for the study of the history of swimming in the United States and around the world.  Exhibits include ancient art and both reproductions and original art depicting famous moments in swimming history (from ancient times to modern), swimwear, and civil rights, as well as memorabilia and artifacts belonging to persons who have promoted or excelled in aquatics.  It is recognized by FINA (Fédération Internationale de Natation) as the official hall for the aquatics sports.

History
In 1965, Johnny Weissmuller became the president of the International Swimming Hall of Fame, that with this charge in 1970 was present at the Commonwealth Games in Jamaica and was introduced to Queen Elizabeth. ISHOF was incorporated in Florida as a non-profit educational corporation on November 23, 1964, with Buck Dawson, as its first executive director. Nine months later—in August 1965—a 50-meter pool, 25-yard diving well, and warm-up pool were completed. This initial part of the Swimming Hall of Fame complex was dedicated on December 27, 1965, witnessed by 4,500 swimmers and other spectators from all fifty states and eleven foreign countries. In 1968, the then-Swimming Hall of Fame became the first world-recognized hall of fame in any sport, when the 105-nation FINA Congress met at the Summer Olympics in Mexico City and endorsed the hall of fame as an "International Swimming Hall of Fame". On June 16, 1969, the organization's Articles of Incorporation were amended to reflect that the name was changed to "International Swimming Hall of Fame". The first members of the hall of fame—a class of twenty-one—were inducted in 1965. See the full list of all honorees since 1965

In 2017, the International Swimming Hall of Fame (ISHOF) merged its operations with Swimming World Magazine. The combination provided the International Swimming Hall of Fame with an outreach arm, that Swimming World can provide, to the athletes, coaches and volunteers around the world in aquatics. Brent Rutemiller will become the Chief Executive Officer overseeing the merger.

Mission
The Hall of Fame's mission is to collaborate with aquatic organizations worldwide to preserve, educate and celebrate the history of aquatic sports while promoting Every Child A Swimmer (Tackling the national epidemic of childhood drowning head on, the International Swimming Hall of Fame is a driving force behind nationwide legislation to require swim lessons for all children before they are admitted into kindergarten).

Vision 
To be the global focal point for sharing cultures, showcasing events, increasing participation in aquatic sports and developing educational and lesson programs that promote swimming as an essential life-skill.

Nominations 
The Executive Nomination Committee, with the help of ISHOF Staff and the Executive Nomination Committee Chairman oversees the nomination process for the following 9 categories:

 Swimming
 Open Water/Marathon Swimming
 Diving
 Water Polo
 Artistic Swimming (Synchronized Swimming)
 Paralympics
 Coach 
 Contributor (to aquatics)
 Pioneer

(Nominations can be submitted on the ISHOF website.)

Members

See also
Aquatic Hall of Fame and Museum of Canada
List of Swimming World Swimmers of the Year
List of FINA Athletes of the Year
Every Child a Swimmer

References

External links
International Swimming Hall of Fame
International Marathon Swimming Hall of Fame

Awards established in 1965
Halls of fame in Florida
International Swimming Hall of Fame
Museums in Fort Lauderdale, Florida
Sports organizations established in 1964
Sports museums in Florida
Swimming awards
 
1964 establishments in Florida